Killer Bunnies and the Journey to Jupiter (or J2J to its fans) is a board game with a non-collectible card game element created by Jeff Bellinger and published by Playroom Entertainment. It is the sequel game to Killer Bunnies and the Quest for the Magic Carrot.

Gameplay 
The primary strategy of the Journey to Jupiter is for a player to keep as many of their bunnies alive while trying to eliminate the opponents' bunnies (both on the ground and in space). Players must have at least one bunny alive (in space) at the end of the game to win.

The secondary strategy of the game is to explore the solar system by launching  bunnies into space in ships. Once in space, the bunnies collect Carrot markers and journey to the planet Jupiter.

A player owns any Carrot that he brings to the planet Jupiter, and at the end of the game when all Carrots have been claimed, the Magic (or winning) Carrot is revealed. The more Carrots a player owns, the better that player's chances will be of owning the Magic Carrot and winning the game.

Players of Killer Bunnies and the Quest for the Magic Carrot will recognise much of the play system as the method of playing cards is much the same with the main changes being the use of the boards, ships and the method of collecting carrots.

Expansions 
Much like for Killer Bunnies and the Quest for the Magic Carrot, J2J has several planned expansions which will add new cards and additional board sections to the game, making the play area larger and adding extra rules, carrots and assorted stuff.

The Blue set is the starter deck and contains 8 carrots, 110 play cards and the first 9 sectors of the board including the Sun, Earth, Mars and Jupiter.

The Yellow booster deck comes packaged with the blue set and adds an extra 55 cards.

The Laser Red booster deck is sold separately to the standard game and adds another 55 cards and another 3 sectors of the board as well as the planet Saturn.

There are four planned expansions to the game each coming as a booster set in colours red, purple, green, and orange. The first, the Laser Red expansion, was released in the 3rd Quarter of 2009.

So far, there have been two promo cards which are usually given alongside the game when you purchase it from playroom or most retailers.

Fans 
There are many fansites dedicated to Killer Bunnies, one of which is The Magic Carrot . This site operates as a messageboard for players of the game to communicate opinions, ideas and conversation on all things Killer Bunnies.

Board games introduced in 2008